The balloon shark (Cephaloscyllium sufflans) is a species of catshark, and part of the family Scyliorhinidae, endemic to the southwestern Indian Ocean off South Africa and Mozambique. This thick-bodied species has a broad, flattened head and a short tail; its distinguishing traits include narrow, lobe-like skin flaps in front of the nostrils, and a dorsal color pattern of faint darker saddles on a light grayish background.

Befitting its common name, the balloon shark can inflate itself with water or air as a defense against predators. It feeds on a variety of crustaceans, cephalopods, and fishes. Reproduction is oviparous, with females producing egg cases two at a time. This species is caught incidentally in bottom trawls but does not seem to be threatened by fishing pressure, hence its assessment as near threatened by the International Union for Conservation of Nature (IUCN).

Taxonomy
British ichthyologist Charles Tate Regan described the balloon shark as Scyliorhinus sufflans in a 1921 issue of the scientific journal Annals and Magazine of Natural History. He placed the species within the subgenus Cephaloscyllium, which later authors have elevated to the rank of full genus.

Distribution and habitat
The range of the balloon shark is likely restricted to the waters off the South African province of KwaZulu-Natal and Mozambique. Additional records from the Gulf of Aden and off Vietnam appear to represent different, yet-undescribed species. It favors sandy and muddy substrates.

Description
The snout is short and rounded, with each nostril divided by a narrow lobe on its anterior rim. The horizontally oval eyes are equipped with rudimentary nictitating membranes (protective third eyelids) and placed rather high on the head. Above and below each eye are ridges, and behind is a small spiracle. The capacious mouth forms a wide arch and lacks furrows at the corners; the upper teeth are exposed when the mouth is closed. There are around 60 upper and 44 lower tooth rows; each tooth has a strong central cusp flanked on either side by 1–2 tiny cusplets. Of the five pairs of gill slits, the third pair is the longest.

The first dorsal fin is positioned about opposite the pelvic fins; the second dorsal fin is much smaller and placed opposite the anal fin. The pectoral fins are large and broad. The pelvic fins are low; adult males have rather short, thick claspers. The anal fin is smaller than the first dorsal fin but much larger than the second, and is relatively deep. The tail is short, with a deep caudal fin that bears a small lower lobe and a ventral notch near the tip of the upper lobe. The skin is thick and roughened by well-calcified dermal denticles; each denticle is triangular and pointed. This species is light grayish brown to purplish above, including the upper surface of the pectoral fins, and paler below. A series of 6–7 faint darker saddles are present along the back and tail, which are more obvious in younger sharks. The fins lack obvious lighter margins.

Biology and ecology
Like other members of its genus, the balloon shark is capable of greatly inflating its stomach with water or air as a defense mechanism. The diet of the balloon shark consists mainly of lobsters, shrimps, and cephalopods, while bony fishes and other elasmobranchs may also be consumed. It is oviparous, with females producing encapsulated eggs two at a time, one per oviduct. Deposited eggs have yet to be recovered, implying that spawning occurs in deeper and/or more northerly waters that are frequented by the adults.

Human interactions
The balloon shark has almost no economic value, though the skin may be utilized. It is regularly caught incidentally and discarded by commercial bottom trawlers operating in parts of its range, though its population does not yet appear to have been negatively impacted. As a result, the International Union for Conservation of Nature (IUCN) has listed this shark under near threatened, while recommending that relevant fisheries be carefully monitored.

References

balloon shark
Fish of the Indian Ocean
Fish of Mozambique
Marine fish of South Africa
balloon shark
Taxa named by Charles Tate Regan